Badami Assembly seat is one of 224 assembly constituencies in Karnataka State, in India. It is part of Bagalkot (Lok Sabha constituency).

Assembly Members

Bombay State
 1951: Venkanagouda Hanmantgouda Patil, Indian National Congress

Mysore State
 1957: Venkanagouda Hanmantgouda Patil, Indian National Congress
 1962: Madivalappa Rudrappa, Indian National Congress
 1967: P. K. Mahagundappa, Independent
 1972: Raosaheb Desai, Indian National Congress

Karnataka State
 1978:	B B Chimmanakatti, Indian National Congress (Indira)
 1983:	B B Chimmanakatti, Indian National Congress
 1985:	Desai Ravasaheb Tulasigerappa, Janata Party
 1989:	Pattanashetti Mahagindap Pa. Kallappa, Janata Dal

Election results

2018 Assembly Election

1962 Election
 Madivalappa Rudrappa (Indian National Congress) : 17,573 votes 
 Shankarappa Shankarappa Pattanshetti (Swatantra Party) : 11,585

See also
List of constituencies of the Karnataka Legislative Assembly

References

Assembly constituencies of Karnataka
Bagalkot district